Andrei Lozhkin (born January 2, 1985) is a Russian retired ice hockey centre.

Career 
Lozhkin played twenty games in the Russian Superleague and three games in the Kontinental Hockey League for Dynamo Moscow. He spent the majority of his career in Russia's second-tier leagues the Vysshaya Liga and the Supreme Hockey League. He played for Torpedo Nizhny Novgorod and Olimpiya Kirovo-Chepetsk of the Vysshaya Liga before playing for Dynamo Moscow.

He also played for Gazprom-OGU Orenburg, Rubin Tyumen, HC Ryazan, Ariada Volzhsk and HC Kuban before finishing his career with Yuzhny Ural Orsk.

References

External links

1985 births
Living people
Ariada Volzhsk players
HC Dynamo Moscow players
Gazprom-OGU Orenburg players
HC Kuban players
Russian ice hockey centres
HC Ryazan players
Torpedo Nizhny Novgorod players
Yuzhny Ural Orsk players